David Gahr (September 18, 1922 – May 25, 2008) was an American photographer, known for his work with famous musicians.

Biography 
Gahr was born on September 18, 1922 in Milwaukee, Wisconsin, to Russian immigrant parents. He enlisted in the US Army the day after the attack on Pearl Harbor and served in the infantry in Europe.He was one of the American soldiers who helped liberate concentration camp survivors. After World War II, he studied economics at the University of Wisconsin-Madison on the G.I. Bill and earned his doctorate at Columbia University on a scholarship. He later became one of "the pre-eminent photographers of American folk, blues, jazz and rock musicians of the 1960s and beyond".

His photographic output includes more than five decades covering musicians like Phil Spector, Bob Dylan, Miles Davis, Bruce Springsteen, Van Morrison, Janis Joplin, Sonny Terry, John Lennon and Pete Seeger, among others. His book, The Face of Folk Music (Citadel Press, 1968) with writer Robert Shelton captured the exploding American folk music scene, with hundreds of images including Dylan, Joan Baez, Pete Seeger, Judy Collins, Tom Paxton, Phil Ochs, Odetta, Buddy Guy, Junior Wells, Mary Travers and Johnny Cash, among others. His work appeared prominently in major publications worldwide and went on record covers of many musicians. He photographed for Time magazine from the mid 1960s to the mid 1970s.

His body of work is considered one of the most beautiful and significant collections of art of all time. His work is in major museum collections including The Metropolitan Museum of Art and The Museum of Modern Art. He also photographed many of the leading post war artists including the very private Joseph Cornell with whom he was a personal friend. His brilliance both visually and verbally helped him create a dazzling photographic body of work of spectacular gravitas and visual power.

Dozens of Wikipedia pages include reference to Gahr's photographs, like those of The Wild, the Innocent & the E Street Shuffle, His Band and the Street Choir, Love, God, Murder, The Fugs First Album, Doc Watson and Son, Doc Watson at Gerdes Folk City, Stages: The Lost Album, The Essential Stevie Ray Vaughan and Double Trouble, and others.

Gahr died in Brooklyn on May 25, 2008 at the age of 85.  He left behind a son and his daughter, Carla Gahr (also a NYC-based photographer, who, with her father, managed the David Gahr photography studio and archives).

References

External links
The David Gahr collection of photographs is held by the Metropolitan Museum of Art, the Museum of Modern Art and the Smithsonian Museum and important collections throughout the world.

1922 births
2008 deaths
Artists from Milwaukee
University of Wisconsin–Madison College of Letters and Science alumni
20th-century American photographers
American people of Russian descent
United States Army personnel of World War II